Top Aces Inc. is a Montreal, Quebec-based defence contractor that offers contracted airborne training services to the Canadian Armed Forces through the Contracted Airborne Training Services (CATS) program. Top Aces operates a fleet of modernized fighter aircraft to provide Red Air threat replication, Joint Terminal Attack Controller (JTAC) training, practice munitions drop, air-to-air gunnery training and naval target tow profiles for the Canadian and German militaries. It also provides electronic warfare training and tactics development, and supports advanced radar trials in nationally controlled environments. All Electronic Warfare Officers and EW role equipment are provided by 414 Electronic Warfare Squadron, Royal Canadian Air Force as part of the CATS contract.

Canadian Armed Forces personnel are authorized to fly on board Top Aces fighter aircraft.

History

Top Aces was founded in 2000 by three former Royal Canadian Air Force CF-18 fighter pilots. In 2005, Top Aces signed a $94-million contract with the Canadian Armed Forces to supply contracted combat support and adversary training. In 2014, the company signed a contract to provide fast jet airborne training services to the German Armed Forces for five years. In 2017, Top Aces was awarded a long-term Contracted Airborne Training Services contract with the Government of Canada. In March 2017, Top Aces was awarded a contract to provide training support to the Australian Defence Force, with three Alpha Jet aircraft deployed to RAAF Base Williamtown for two years.

Top Aces, formerly Discovery Air Defence Services (DADS), is no longer a 'Wholly Owned Subsidiary' of the parent company Discovery Air. It is now owned by Clairvest and other unnamed investors with transactions completed on 22 December 2017. As of July 2018, Top Aces Inc, Top Aces Holdings Inc and Clairvest are subject to ongoing legal proceedings lodged in the Ontario Superior Court of Justice (Commercial List).

Fleet
Some Alpha Jets retained the German Air Force paint schemes, but others have been repainted in aggressor camouflage colours that mimic certain foreign aircraft. Small low visibility Canadian flags have been added to the vertical tail stabilizers of aircraft contracted to the Royal Canadian Air Force.

As of February 2023, Top Aces. has the following aircraft listed with Transport Canada and operate as Nav Canada airline designator FD, and telephony FISHBED.

Top aces previously operated aircraft:
Beechcraft Super King Air - 2
Bombardier Challenger 600 - 5

Further purchases
In November 2020, it was reported that Top Aces was in negotiations with the Israeli Ministry of Defense for the purchase of 29 early model Lockheed Martin F-16A fighter aircraft with a cost-per unit price of $3–4 million. Four of the planned 29 F-16s arrived in Top Aces F-16 Center of Excellence in Mesa, Arizona in January 2021. Top Aces plans to ship the rest of the orders in 12 batches with two jets arriving every other month.

References

External links

Official site

Defence companies of Canada
2000 establishments in Quebec
Companies based in Montreal
Companies established in 2000